Masjid-e-Bilal (Bilal Mosque) is one of the largest mosques of Bangalore, Karnataka, India.  It was inaugurated in mid-2015. The Turkish-style 'Masjid Eidgah Bilal' on Bannerghatta road was consecrated on 11 June. The mosque sits on the corner of a traffic intersection on a popular thoroughfare of southern part of the city. Prestige Group developers undertook the construction which began in 2010 and was completed recently.  At  that  time Janab Alhaj Habeeb Khan Saheb was president of this committee  from 2004 to 2015.  The mosque constructed at a cost of Rs. 200,000,000 provides space for 6,500 people to pray at a time.  A considerable portion of the cost was contributed by the Prestige Group.

The four story mosque was constructed on a portion of the 1.45-acre Bilal Eidgah. The land was purchased in 1990 for the purpose of Eid congregation ground at a price of  10,000,000 from the Bangalore Development Authority. Local MLA and Ex  transport Minister and Ex Home Minister of Karnataka  Ramalinga Reddy helped the community to acquire the place. 

Present president Alhaj Ashraf Saheb and secretary Alhaj Faiyaz Saheb told the Islamic Voice that the mosque occupies nearly 42,000 sq. ft. area.  The Eidgah ground provides parking space for nearly 500 vehicles.  Hazrath Maulana Mohammed Shakirulla Saheb  is the imam and Khatib of the mosque.  The consecration ceremony had Maulana Qasim Qureshi as the chief guest.

Events
 2015 Eid prayers were held in a mass congregation, with all the roads within a kilometer cordoned off by the local administration.
 2016 a mass wedding program was organized by Mr. Zafuralla, a philanthropist, and 25 to 30 weddings took place under the guidance of the imam.
 2016 Nikah ceremonies were held on a regular basis after Zuhr (afternoon), Asar (evening), and Magrib (dusk) prayers.  The locals considered as to Have their Friends' and Colleagues' nikah conducted here as a proud moment.

Mosques in Karnataka
Religious buildings and structures in Bangalore